Santo Stefano Protomartire is a Roman Catholic church in the town of Pozzaglia Sabina, in the province of Rieti, region of Lazio, Italy.

A church at this site is documented by 1252, however much of this stone church dates from the 15th-century. It still preserves a Romanesque hemicircular apse. It appears to have been patronized by the 17th-century feudal lords of the town, the Marchesi Santacroce. The main altar has a canvas depicting St Helen discovers the true cross by Raffaello Vanni. Other altarpieces in the church depict a Saints and Madonna of the Rosary and a Martyrdom of St Stephen. In the 19th century much of the decoration on the walls was refurbished.

References

Roman Catholic churches in Lazio
Churches in the province of Rieti
Romanesque architecture in Lazio